Orange Bay is a small bay in Portland Parish, Jamaica, fifteen miles west of the capital, Port Antonio. The name is shared by a small village on the shore of the bay.

References

External links 
Aerial view
Photo: 

Bays and coves of Jamaica
Geography of Portland Parish